Chytonix is a genus of moths of the family Noctuidae.

Species
 Chytonix albiplaga Hampson, 1914
 Chytonix albonotata Staudinger
 Chytonix costimacula Wileman, 1915
 Chytonix elegans Schaus 1911
 Chytonix hastata (Moore 1882)
 Chytonix palliatricula (Guenée, 1852)
 Chytonix sensilis Grote, 1881 (=Chytonix ruperti Franclemont, 1941)
 Chytonix subalbonotata Sugi
 Chytonix umbrifera (Butler, 1889)
 Chytonix variegata Wileman, 1914
 Chytonix variegatoides Poole, 1989
 Chytonix vermiculata (Snellen, 1880)

Former species
 Chytonix divesta is now Oligia divesta (Grote, 1874)

References
 Chytonix at Markku Savela's Lepidoptera and Some Other Life Forms
 Natural History Museum Lepidoptera genus database

Hadeninae